Mark Knowles and Daniel Nestor were the defending champions, but lost in the semifinals this year.

Bob Bryan and Mike Bryan won in the final 7–6(11–9), 6–2, against Lucas Arnold and Mariano Hood.

Seeds

Draw

Draw

External links
Draw

2004 ATP Tour
2004 Davidoff Swiss Indoors